The Men's skeet singles event took place at 13 October 2010 at the CRPF Campus. There were two qualification rounds held to determine the finalists.

Results

External links
Report

Shooting at the 2010 Commonwealth Games